Alampa Creek is a stream in the U.S. state of Mississippi. It is a tributary to Pinishook Creek.

Alampa most likely is a name derived from the Choctaw language meaning "hiding places".

Course
Alampa Creek rises about 6 miles northwest of Plattsburg, Mississippi, and then flows generally east to join Pinishook Creek about 2 miles north of Plattsburg.

Watershed
Alampas Creek drains  of area, receives about 57.6 in/year of precipitation, has a wetness index of 458.37, and is about 50% forested.

References

Rivers of Mississippi
Rivers of Winston County, Mississippi
Mississippi placenames of Native American origin